The 2003 Major League Soccer All-Star Game was the 8th Major League Soccer All-Star Game, played on August 2, 2003 at The Home Depot Center, now known as StubHub Center, in Carson, California.  The All-Star Game celebrated both the opening of the league's second soccer-specific stadium that season, as well as the announcement of the league's expansion with an eleventh team purchased by the owners of Mexico's Club Deportivo Guadalajara.  Then-MetroStars head coach Bob Bradley was tapped to lead the MLS All-Stars against Guadalajara, commonly known as Chivas, and led by their head coach, Eduardo de la Torre.

A scoreless first half was marked by a defensive effort for the All-Stars.  The Los Angeles Galaxy's Kevin Hartman made several key saves, while a backline led by Carlos Bocanegra of the Chicago Fire weathered a persistent Chivas attack.  The Fire's Ante Razov scored the first goal in the second half thanks in part to a feed by the San Jose Earthquakes' Landon Donovan past a beaten Oswaldo Sánchez.  Jair Garcia broke away from the defense and beat Hartman to tie the game, but the All-Stars responded shortly thereafter with the eventual-game winner by the Galaxy's Carlos Ruiz.  The Fire's DaMarcus Beasley tipped in the All-Stars' third goal, which Chivas contested because of an assistant referee's offside call, which was waved off by Kevin Terry.  A sellout crowd at The Home Depot Center celebrated the win, as well as the awarding of MVP to local favorite Carlos Ruiz.

Details

External links
MLS All-Star 2003 match report

MLS All-Star Game
All-Star Game
C.D. Guadalajara matches
Sports competitions in Carson, California
2003 in sports in California
Soccer in California
August 2003 sports events in the United States